Taylor Jasmine Hinds (born 25 April 1999) is an English footballer who plays as a fullback or midfielder for Liverpool in the Women's Super League. She has represented England on the under-17 and under-19 national teams.

Playing career
Hinds began playing football at the age of ten with the development squad for Northampton Town. She was scouted by an Arsenal staff member and began playing with the junior squad soon after.

Arsenal
Hinds made her debut for Arsenal during a 7–0 win over London Bees during the 2017 FA WSL Cup. She subbed in during the 46th minute of the match for Emma Mitchell.

Everton
In January 2018, Hinds signed with Everton through summer of 2019 alongside teammate Chloe Kelly, who was already on loan with the Blues.

Liverpool
Hinds signed for Liverpool in July 2020; she signed a new long-term contract in January 2022, winning the FA Women's Championship with the Reds in the same season.

International career
Hinds has represented England on the under-17 and under-19 national teams. She competed with the under-17 team at the 2016 FIFA U-17 Women's World Cup in Jordan.

Career statistics

Club
.

Honours
Liverpool
FA Women's Championship: 2021-22

References

External links
 
 
 England player profile
 Arsenal player profile
 

1999 births
Living people
English women's footballers
Women's Super League players
Everton F.C. (women) players
Arsenal W.F.C. players
Liverpool F.C. Women players
FA Women's National League players
Women's association football midfielders
England women's youth international footballers